Eldon was a privately held company headquartered in Madrid, Spain, and a global manufacturer of standard and customized enclosure solutions for the industrial and building markets.

Product manufacturing was developed in several European production facilities and a plant in Umargam, India. The company had 6 distribution centers and was present in 45 countries around the world.

Products 
nVent HOFFMAN (previously Eldon) offers several ranges of products:

 Floor Standing Enclosures
 Wall Mounted Enclosures
 Terminal Boxes
 Human Machine Interface
 Thermal Management
 Cable Management
 General Accessories
 Power Distribution
 Panel Shop Automation

Corporate information

Name

Eldon means “devices for electricity” in Swedish, a representative name for a company manufacturing enclosures designed to protect highly sensitive electrical and electronic components.

History

Founded in 1922 in Nässjö, Sweden, the original company, was called Elekto Ljus & Kraft, the name changed to AB Eldon-Verken in 1948.  
 
Initially building electrical installation equipment and selling radios, the latest invention at the time, they soon began manufacturing a junction box designed for the use with electric ovens.  
  
In 1963 the first acquisition was made with the take-over of their biggest competitor, Elektriska Osterman AB.  Four years later the Eldon-Osterman companies have merged under the common name of Eldon AB.
 
In 1967 the company expanded abroad, by opening sales offices in several European Countries, starting with the UK and Belgium.
 
The Dutch subsidiary was inaugurated in 1970 in the north of the Netherlands, in Drachten.
 
In 1999 Eldon AB was sold to EQT Partners and in 2006 the new management team acquired the majority shareholding from EQT.

In July 2019, Eldon Enclosures was acquired by nVent Electric plc for $130 million in cash.

References

Computer enclosure companies
Multinational companies